Sabirabad may refer to:
 Sabirabad Rayon, Azerbaijan
 Sabirabad (city), capital of Sabirabad Rayon
Sabirabad, Jalilabad, Azerbaijan